Aminullah Zubair known as Haji Obaid  is an Afghan Taliban politician who is currently serving as governor of Daykundi province since August 2021.

References

Living people
Taliban governors
Governors of Daykundi Province
Year of birth missing (living people)